Dolavon (Welsh: Dolafon) is a small town in the Patagonian province of Chubut, Argentina. The name comes from Welsh dôl (meadow) and afon (river). Welsh immigrants began to settle in the area after their arrival in Patagonia in 1865. The Central Chubut Railway arrived in 1915, linking the settlement to Trelew, and the town was officially founded in 1919. Dolavon became a centre of wheat production using irrigation canals to compensate for the arid climate. The old flour mill with its water wheel is now a museum.

According to plans announced in November 2006, Dolavon was to be the site of important energy generation facilities by mid-2008: a combined cycle power plant (with an output of between 330 and 465 MW) and a wind farm (100 MW).

References

External links
 Dolavon at ArgentinaXplora.com.
 

Populated places in Chubut Province
Populated places established in 1919
Welsh settlement in Patagonia
Cities in Argentina
Argentina